GeekSpeak is a podcast with two to four hosts who focus on technology and technology news of the week. Though originally a radio tech call-in program, which first aired in 1998 on KUSP, GeekSpeak has been a weekly podcast since 2004.

The program's slogan is "Bridging the gap between geeks and the rest of humanity".

History 

GeekSpeak was created and originally broadcast on KUSP by Chris Neklason of Cruzio, Steve Schaefer of Guenther Computer, and board operator Ray Price from KUSP. Shortly there after Mark Hanford of Cruzio joined the program.

Currently, the host/producer is Lyle Troxell, who took over in September 2000.

In April 2016, citing financial difficulties, KUSP stopped broadcasting GeekSpeak with its final broadcast on May 5, 2016.

GeekSpeak episodes have been distributed as an archive on the internet since 2001.  The podcast went live prior to March 5, 2005 with its first episode December 3, 2004.

See also
Computer jargon
Technobabble

External links
GeekSpeak Website
iTunes Podcast

Reference List

American talk radio programs
Presentation